Sakiassie Ragee (1924–2003) was an Inuit artist. Ragee was born in the Northwest Territories.

His work is included in the collections of the National Gallery of Canada, the McMichael Canadian Art Collection and the Art Gallery of Guelph.

References

1924 births
2003 deaths
20th-century Canadian artists
21st-century Canadian artists
Inuit artists
Canadian male artists
Artists from the Northwest Territories
20th-century Canadian male artists
21st-century Canadian male artists